Pavão may refer to:

Places
Pavão, Minas Gerais, a municipality in Brazil
Vila Pavão, Espírito Santo, a municipality in Brazil
Figueira Pavão, a settlement in the island of Fogo in Cape Verde

People
Pavão (footballer, born 1947), Portuguese footballer
Pavão (footballer, born 1974), Brazilian footballer
Pavão (basketball) (born 1917), Brazilian basketball player

See also
 Pavao (disambiguation)